Nathaniel Jackson may refer to:

 Nathaniel E. Jackson (born 1972), American convicted murderer
 Nathaniel J. Jackson (18181892), American machinist and soldier

See also
Nathan Jackson (disambiguation)